A list of notable politicians of the Democrats of the Left party of Italy:

A
Marisa Abbondanzieri
Nicola Adamo
Mauro Agostini
Gavino Angius
Aldo Aniasi
Pino Arlacchi
Corrado Augias
Giuseppe Ayala

B
Franco Bassanini
Antonio Bassolino
Giovanni Battaglia
Giorgio Benvenuto
Giovanni Berlinguer
Luigi Berlinguer
Pier Luigi Bersani
Mercedes Bresso
Claudio Burlando

C
Pierre Carniti
Patrizia Casagrande Esposto
Luca Ceriscioli
Sergio Chiamparino
Massimo Cialente
Sergio Cofferati
Paola Concia
Gianni Cuperlo

D
Massimo D'Alema
Vito D'Ambrosio
Cesare Damiano
Leonardo Domenici

E
Vasco Errani

F
Italo Falcomatà
Piero Fassino
Giovanni Claudio Fava
Massimo Federici
Emanuele Fiano
Anna Finocchiaro

G
Giuseppe Giulietti
Donata Gottardi
Franco Grillini
Lilli Gruber

I
Nilde Iotti

K
 Giovanni Kessler

L
Vincenzo Lavarra
 Carlo Leoni
Maria Rita Lorenzetti
Giuseppe Lumia

M
Luigi Manconi
Pietro Marcenaro
Catiuscia Marini
Ignazio Marino
Giovanna Melandri
Maurizio Migliavacca
Marco Minniti
Fabio Mussi

N
Pasqualina Napoletano
Giorgio Napolitano

O
Achille Occhetto
Mario Oliverio
Rosario Olivo
Andrea Orlando

P
Pier Antonio Panzeri
Giovanni Pellegrino
Giuseppe Pericu
Claudio Petruccioli
Roberta Pinotti
Gianni Pittella
Barbara Pollastrini

R
Piero Rebaudengo
Stefano Rodotà

S
Guido Sacconi
Cataldo Salerno
Cesare Salvi
Michele Santoro
Marina Sereni
Valdo Spini

T
Livia Turco

V
Gianni Vattimo
Walter Veltroni
Ugo Vetere
Marta Vincenzi
Luciano Violante
Demetrio Volcic

Z
Mauro Zani
Flavio Zanonato

Democrats of the Left